Strima is a village in the municipality of Lipkovo, North Macedonia.

Demographics
As of the 2021 census, Strima had 9 residents with the following ethnic composition:
Persons for whom data are taken from administrative sources 9

According to the 2002 census, the village had a total of 3 inhabitants. Ethnic groups in the village include:

Albanians 3

References

External links

Villages in Lipkovo Municipality
Albanian communities in North Macedonia